Dynatophysis is a genus of moth in the family Cosmopterigidae. It contains only one species, Dynatophysis perichrysa, which is found in New Guinea.

References

External links
Natural History Museum Lepidoptera genus database

Cosmopterigidae
Monotypic moth genera